Mandata is an unincorporated community in Northumberland County, in the U.S. state of Pennsylvania.

References

Unincorporated communities in Northumberland County, Pennsylvania
Unincorporated communities in Pennsylvania